Sandrine Rouquet is a former football player who played as a forward for French club  Toulouse of the Division 1 Féminine.

International career

Rouquet represented France 6 times in 2001. Rouquest also participated at the 2002 UEFA Women's Under-19 Championship.

References

1983 births
Living people
Toulouse FC (women) players
French women's footballers
Division 1 Féminine players
Women's association football forwards
France women's youth international footballers
France women's international footballers